The discography of English singer and songwriter Rick Astley consists of nine studio albums, five compilation albums, two remix albums, and twenty-four singles.

His debut studio album, Whenever You Need Somebody, was released in November 1987. It peaked at number 1 on the UK Albums Chart and number 10 on the US Billboard 200. Astley became a global pop sensation in 1987 with his debut single "Never Gonna Give You Up" written by the trio Stock Aitken Waterman. The song was at number one on the UK Singles Chart for five weeks, becoming the year's highest-selling single. The song was also a worldwide number one hit, topping the charts in 24 other countries, including the US, Australia, and Germany. "Whenever You Need Somebody" was released as the second single from the album in October 1987. The single was a recycled Stock, Aitken, Waterman song, originally recorded by O'Chi Brown in 1985. It became a successful European hit, reaching number 1 in seven countries, including Germany and Sweden, following up the success of his debut single. It also reached Number 3 in the UK. In December 1987, Astley released a cover version of the Nat King Cole classic "When I Fall in Love". This single is mainly remembered for a closely fought contest for UK Christmas Number 1. Astley's fourth single release would be "Together Forever" in 1988, reaching Number 2 in the UK. It was denied the top spot by Kylie Minogue's debut "I Should Be So Lucky". The song was more successful in the US, reaching number 1, making it his second US chart topper. His fifth and final release from his debut album was "It Would Take a Strong Strong Man". It was a more soulful song when compared to his other releases and was mainly intended for the North American market. It was another hit for Astley reaching Number 10 on the US Billboard Hot 100 and Number 1 in Canada.

His second studio album, Hold Me in Your Arms, was released in November 1988. It peaked at number 8 on the UK Albums Chart and number 19 on the US Billboard 200. The lead single, "She Wants to Dance with Me" was Astley's first single which he wrote himself and became a worldwide top 10 hit. In Europe, "Take Me to Your Heart" and "Hold Me in Your Arms" were released as the next singles. "Giving Up on Love" was released as the second single off the album in the US and Canada and was later released in some countries of continental Europe as the fourth and last single off the album and a cover of The Temptations' "Ain't Too Proud to Beg" was released as the third and last single in the US and Japan.

His third studio album, Free, was released in March 1991. It peaked at number 9 on the UK Albums Chart and number 31 on the US Billboard 200. It was his first album not to be produced by the noted production team of Stock Aitken Waterman. It gave Astley another hit single in the ballad "Cry for Help" which became a Top 10 in both the UK and US. Further singles "Move Right Out" and "Never Knew Love" were less successful.

His fourth studio album, Body & Soul, was released in September 1993. It peaked at number 185 on the US Billboard 200. Two singles were released from the album "The Ones You Love" and "Hopelessly". After this album, Astley left the music business behind for several years and released no new material until 2001. It is estimated that by retirement at the end of 1993 Rick Astley had sold approximately 40 million records.

His fifth studio album, Keep It Turned On, was released in December 2001. The album peaked at number 56 on the German Albums Chart. Two singles were released from the album "Sleeping" and "Keep It Turned On". "Sleeping" peaked at No. 60 in Germany and No. 69 in Switzerland.

His sixth studio album, Portrait, was released in October 2005. The album peaked at number 26 on the UK Albums Chart. His first album to chart in the UK since Free in 1991. My Red Book, was planned to be released in January 2013. This unreleased album contains tracks such as "Lights Out", "Superman" and "Goodbye But Not the End". "Let It Rain" and "I Like the Sun" appear on his album 50. "Lights Out" was released in 2010, his first single released in the UK for almost 17 years.

His seventh studio album, 50, was released in June 2016. The album peaked at number 1 on the UK Albums Chart, becoming Astley's first number-one album since his 1987 debut album, Whenever You Need Somebody. "Keep Singing" was released as the lead single from the album on 6 April 2016, peaking to number 127 on the UK Singles Chart. "Angels on My Side" was released as the second single from the album on 13 May 2016.

His eighth studio album, Beautiful Life, was released in July 2018. The album peaked at number 6 on the UK Albums Chart, becoming Astley's fifth top ten album in the United Kingdom. The album includes the singles "Beautiful Life" and "Empty Heart".

His greatest hits album, The Best of Me, was released in October 2019. The first compilation to be compiled by Astley, it features hit singles and album tracks throughout Astley's career. The deluxe version of the album includes a second disc which features several pianoforte versions of the singles featured on the first disc. A pianoforte version of "Never Gonna Give You Up" is included on the first disc.

Albums

Studio albums

Studio albums, only released in certain countries

Compilation albums

Remix albums

Unreleased albums

Singles

As lead artist

1980s

1990s–2000s

2010s–present

As featured artist

Notes
A  Not released in North America.
B  Not released in the United Kingdom and most of Europe.
C  Released in Germany and Switzerland only.
D  Promoted in the United Kingdom only.

References

Discographies of British artists
Pop music discographies
Discography